The Tanzer 28 is a Canadian sailboat, that was designed by Johann Tanzer and first built in 1972. The design is out of production.

Production
Production of the boat was commenced in 1972 by Tanzer Industries of Dorion, Quebec. The company entered bankruptcy in May 1986 and production had ended by then.

Design

The Tanzer 28 is a small recreational keelboat, built predominantly of fibreglass, with wood trim. It has a masthead sloop rig, a transom-hung rudder and a fixed fin keel. It displaces  and carries  of ballast.

The boat has a PHRF racing average handicap of 204, with a low of 216 and a high of 192.

Operational history
In a review Michael McGoldrick wrote, "The Tanzer 28 is a well built boat with what could be the largest interior of any production 28 foot sailboat anywhere. The floor plan of this boat doesn't do justice to the amount of space found in its main cabin. Unfortunately, the Tanzer 28 has something of an odd appearance. The kindest thing that can be said about it is that it looks like an over inflated Tanzer 22."

See also
List of sailing boat types
Similar sailboats
Alerion Express 28
Aloha 28
Beneteau First 285
Beneteau Oceanis 281
Bristol Channel Cutter
Cal 28
Catalina 28
Crown 28
Cumulus 28
Grampian 28
Hunter 28
Hunter 28.5
Hunter 280
O'Day 28
Pearson 28
Sabre 28
Sea Sprite 27
Sirius 28
Tanzer 8.5
TES 28 Magnam
Viking 28

References

External links

Keelboats
1980s sailboat type designs
Sailing yachts
Sailboat type designs by Johann Tanzer
Sailboat types built by Tanzer Industries